Au Sable or Ausable  may refer to various places:

Michigan

Au Sable Township, Iosco County, Michigan
Au Sable, Michigan, an unincorporated community in the above township
Au Sable Township, Roscommon County, Michigan

New York

Au Sable, New York
Ausable Chasm

See also
Au Sable River (disambiguation)